Southwest Washington Regional Airport  is a city-owned public-use airport located two nautical miles (3.7 km) southeast of the central business district of Kelso, in Cowlitz County, Washington, United States. The airport was renamed in 2009, 
prior to which it was known as the Kelso-Longview Regional Airport, or Molt Taylor Field, named after flying car designer Moulton Taylor.

History 
In 1950 the old landing strip was paved and in the 1960s the first administration and terminal buildings were built. Further improvements were completed in the 1980s due to increasing traffic.

Facilities and aircraft 
It has one asphalt paved runway designated 12/30 which measure 4,391 x . (1,338 x 30 m). It is separated for takeoffs and landings (the airport, faced with growing air traffic, segmented their runway in 1980).

For the 12-month period ending March 30, 2008, the airport had 40,860 aircraft operations, an average of 111 per day: 94% general aviation, 4% air taxi and 2% military. At that time there were 71 aircraft based at this airport: 85% single-engine, 10% multi-engine, 1% jet and 4% ultralight.

The airport has one passenger terminal.

Flight School 
There is one flight school located at the airport.

References

External links 
 , official site
 Airport Web Cam at WSDOT Aviation site
 Aerial photo as of 24 July 2000 from USGS The National Map
 

Airports in Washington (state)
Longview, Washington
Transportation buildings and structures in Cowlitz County, Washington
1941 establishments in Washington (state)
Airports established in 1941